is a ravine in Japan noted for its beauty.

Overview
Taishaku Valley is an 18 km-long ravine along the Taishaku River, one of the tributaries of the Takahashi River in Shōbara and Jinsekikōgen, Hiroshima, Japan.

The valley is a part of Hiba-Dogo-Taishaku Quasi-National Park.  It is known for autumn leaves and maples.

See also
Hiba-Dogo-Taishaku Quasi-National Park
List of national parks of Japan

External links
Taishaku Valley
Tojo-cho.com: Taishaku-kyo Ravine
 Taisyaku-kyō

Tourist attractions in Hiroshima Prefecture
Landforms of Hiroshima Prefecture
Valleys of Japan
Ravines